Carlos López or Carlos Lopes may refer to:

People named Carlos López

Sportspeople
Carlos Ángel López (1952–2018), Argentine footballer
 Carlos López (baseball) (born 1948), Mexican baseball player
 Carlos López (equestrian) (born 1926), Spanish equestrian
 Carlos López Cortéz (born 1996), Mexican footballer
 Carlos López Huesca (born 1990), Spanish footballer
 Carlos López de Lerma (born 1984), Spanish footballer
 Carlos López de Silanes (born 1970), Mexican football (soccer) player
 Carlos Javier López (born 1980), Argentine footballer
 Carlos Cuque López (born 1945), a long-distance runner from Guatemala 
 Carlos Lόpez, early in-ring name of Mexican professional wrestling legend Tarzán López

Entertainers
 Carlos Lopez (dancer), former soloist, American Ballet Theatre
 Carlos Lopez (French actor), featured in Savage Nights and Savage Souls
 Carlos López Avila (born 1973), known as Jeremías, Venezuelan singer and composer
 Carlos López Buchardo (1881–1948), Argentine composer
 Carlos López Estrada (borne 1988), music video director
 Carlos López Moctezuma (1909–1980), Mexican film actor
 Carlos López y Valles (1887-1942), Mexican actor
 Carlos López Puccio (born 1946), musician, conductor and composer

Politicians
 Carlos López Bonilla, Puerto Rican politician and mayor of Rincón, Puerto Rico
 Carlos López Contreras (born 1942), Honduran politician
 Carlos López Rivera (born 1958), Puerto Rican politician and mayor of Dorado, Puerto Rico
 Carlos Antonio López (1790–1862), Paraguayan politician
 Carlos López Riaño (1940–2022), Spanish politician

Others
 Carlos López Bustamante (1890–1950), Venezuelan journalist
 Carlos Lopez (artist) (1908–1953), American painter
 Carlos Lopez (c. 1959–1984), Mexican school shooting victim of Tyrone Mitchell at the 49th Street Elementary School shooting
 Carlos Lopez (stuntman) (1989–2014), American stunt performer
 Carlos López Lozano (born 1962), Bishop of the Spanish Reformed Episcopal Church since 1995
 Carlos F. López (born 1975), Colombian-American scientist

People named Carlos Lopes
 Carlos Lopes (born 1947), Portuguese long-distance athlete, who won the marathon at the 1984 Los Angeles Olympics
 Carlos Lopes (parathlete), Portuguese Paralympian athlete
 Carlos Eduardo Lopes (born 1980), Brazilian footballer
 Carlos Lopes (Guinea Bissau) (born 1960), Executive Secretary of the Economic Commission for Africa of the United Nations

Other uses
 Carlos A. López, a neighbourhood of Asunción, Paraguay

See also
 Carlos Lopes (born 1947), Portuguese long distance runner
 Carlos Lopes (parathlete) (active 1996-2008), Portuguese sprinter